The Russification of Poland was an intense process, especially under Partitioned Poland, when the Russian state aimed to denationalise Poles via incremental enforcement of language, culture, the arts, the Orthodox religion and Russian practices. The most forceful Russification was enforced onto children, due to their poor knowledge of Polish culture and language.

History

The self-will of Grand Duke Konstantin and the infraction of the Constitution of the Kingdom of Poland, together with the rise of secret societies, led to the November Uprising (1830-1831). The intensification of Russification occurred after the aforesaid uprising failed, leading to the abolishment of the Constitution of 1815 (granting the Kingdom of Poland national autonomy). In 1832, with the implementation of the Organic Statute of the Kingdom of Poland, the Sejm was liquidated along with the Kingdom's armed forces, Russian institutions and law was implemented and any aide to the November Uprising had their landed property seized.

Martial law was implemented in 1833. All decisions were given by Russian military chiefs, and Namiestnik Ivan Paskevich. The retained Council of State (until 1914) had a Russian majority. Gradually, most aspects of society were subject to central authority in St. Petersburg. The Vilnius University, Krzemieniec Lyceum and other Polish gymnasiums were liquidated.

The Russian monetary system was implemented in 1841, followed by the Russian code of law in 1847. The next move forward was to subordinate the Kingdom of Poland to the Russian Namiestnik, Ivan Paskevich. In 1837, Polish voivodeships, forming the administrative division of the Kingdom, were renamed to governates, reflecting the Imperial Russian model.

The next exacerbation of Russification came after the failed January Uprising (1863-1864): the implementation of an interminable, the Russification of administrative and educational institutions, the liquidation of the Uniate Church in January 1874, Russian soldiers killed at least ten Uniates in Drelów and thirteen in Pratulin. Poles underwent expulsions and were expropriated. Initially, Polish town names were Russified. In 1869, the Warsaw Main School was closed down, and in its location, the Russian language Imperial University was opened. The years 1869-1885 saw the systematic removal of the Polish language from the education system, the end result, in 1885, was its placement as a second, uncompulsory school language. Only religion was taught in Polish. Dmitry Ilovaysky's history text books were enforced in school history classes, falsifying history and as such continually implemented Russification. Additionally, the Russian language was introduced into folk schools. Conclusively, speaking the Polish language was banned in institutions of education. There was also an attempt to introduce the Cyrillic alphabet into Polish.

The budget of the Kingdom of Poland was amalgamated into that of the Russian Empire. In 1874, the position of Namiestnik was replaced by Governate-General. The Governate-General would head the Warsaw Military District that encompassed all of Congress Poland.

The symbolic figure behind the Russification was Governate-General of the Warsaw Military District, Alexander Apukthin, who inter alia introduced the education of skilled informers and the double-crossing of students, which became fundamental to the policing in schools. In 1869, Russian became the sole legal language for courts and the administration. In 1875, the then Polish court procedure was abolished in favour of its Russian counterpart. Until World War I, the Kingdom of Poland was beset by "extraordinary rights", by which the Governate-General had the authority to bring any civil individual to trial at a military court, or send them into the Russian Far East if they are deemed a  "political suspect". In 1885, the Bank of Poland was replaced by a cantor of the Russian State Bank.

Many Orthodox churches were constructed in Poland under the governor Iosif Gurko. Their presence intended to manifest Russian rule and underline "Russianess" of the Polish territories. In the last decade of the 19th century, around 20 Orthodox Churches in characteristic Russo-Byzantine imperial style were built in Warsaw alone. 

More radical Russification occurred in parts of the Polish–Lithuanian Commonwealth, that after the Partitions were not incorporated into the Kingdom of Poland and instead directly into the Russian Empire. The Vilnius University and Krzemieniec Lyceum were closed down, as a retribution for the participation of the students in the November Uprising. Between 1832 and 1834, by royal prerogative of Tsar Nicholas I, several thousand Polish families were expelled to Siberia from Wołyn and Podole. When in 1839 the Uniate Church was liquidated, its followers and priests were forced to convert to Eastern Orthodoxy. The Roman Catholic Church saw further restrictions, with its landed wealth seized, after proclaiming support for the January Uprising. Property was similarly seized from the participants of the January Uprising, with land proprietors having an additional tax levied onto their property. It was prohibited for Poles to buy land. Polish theatres, periodicals, schools and societies were liquidated. The aforesaid methods of Russification were also enforced on other non-Russian populations, with the type of severity dependent on the locality.

References

19th century in the Russian Empire
Anti-Polish sentiment in Europe
Second Polish Republic
Russification
Genocides in Europe